Krajina Belojević was the Serbian župan of Travunia, an administrative unit of the Principality of Serbia, in the 9th century. In 847/848, not long after the three-year Bulgarian–Serbian War (839–842) in which Prince Vlastimir of Serbia (r. ca. 836-850) defeated the Bulgar army sent by Presian I, Krajina married the daughter of Prince Vlastimir and gained a raising in rank, and was entitled the županate centered on Trebinje (a province in the "maritime", Pomorje, part of modern Herzegovina), which had earlier been held by Krajina's father, the local lord Beloje. His father-in-law was the eponymous founder of the Vlastimirović dynasty, which would rule Serbia until 969. Krajina continued the office under Mutimir (r. 850–891). With the unnamed daughter of Vlastimir, Krajina had a son that would succeed him, Hvalimir. Hvalimir in turn had a son, Čučimir (r. first half of 10th century), who was the last known Belojević in charge of Travunia, as it Serbia fell to the Byzantine Empire, in ca. 969.

See also
Drosaico and Ljudislav (fl. 836-840), župans of Narentia who defeated Venetian doge, Pietro Tradonico (r. 836–864), and hundreds of his men in 839/840

Notes

References

Sources
 
 
 
 
 Tibor Živković, Portreti srpskih vladara (IX—XII), Beograd, 2006, pp. 11–15 
 Božidar Ferjančić, „Vizantijski izvori za istoriju naroda Jugoslavije II“ (fototipsko izdanje originala iz 1959), Beograd, 2007.  (str. 62) 
 Grupa autora, „Istorija srpskog naroda I“, Beograd, 1981. (str. 148) 
 Andrija Veselinović, Radoš Ljušić, „Srpske dinastije“, Novi Sad, 2001.  (str. 24) 
 P. Radonjić, „Velaj“, u: Srpski biografski rečnik, II tom, ur. Čedomir Popov, Novi Sad 2008, str. 109-110. 

9th-century Serbian nobility
People from Trebinje
Slavic warriors